Ambitions Academies Trust is a multi-academy trust, serving schools in or close to Bournemouth and Weymouth, Dorset.

Primary academies
Manorside Primary
Elm Academy
Queen's Park Academy
King's Park Academy
Bayside Academy
Kinson Academy

Secondary academies
St Aldhelm's Academy
LeAF Studio
Oak Academy, Bournemouth
All Saints Church of England Academy, Wyke Regis
Wey Valley Academy, Weymouth

Specials
Tregonwell Academy - is for statemented pupils with Behavioural, Emotional and Social Difficulties; it provides Alternative Provision a Pupil Placement Service and support to mainstream schools and other academies through CPD, leadership, behaviour management and safeguarding training. It started as a residential school for boys called Bicknell School in 1968. It operates on three campuses: Petersfield Campus, Nigel Bowes Campus and Throop Learning Centre.
Longspree Academy

References

Multi-academy trusts